The 1990 International Formula 3000 Championship was a motor racing competition organised by the FIA for Formula 3000 cars. It was the sixth running of an FIA Formula 3000 Championship. 

Érik Comas won the eleven-round championship.

Season summary
The season began on a damp Donington Park track. On the second lap, Allan McNish and Emanuele Naspetti collided on the straight before the Esses. McNish’s car went over the concrete wall, and its engine broke away and killed a spectator. Meanwhile, the race continued uninterrupted and several drivers, including polesitter Andrea Montermini, spun off in the damp conditions. McNish’s DAMS Lola teammate Érik Comas took the victory.

At the next round at Silverstone, Damon Hill overtook the two DAMS cars at the start, but suffered the same rear tire failure that had earlier claimed his teammate Gary Brabham. McNish took an emotional win just one week after his Donington crash.

The third round at Pau had to be restarted twice after accidents caused traffic jams on the narrow streets. Marco Apicella took a commanding lead, but slid off into a tire barrier, leaving Eric van de Poele to take the win. Érik Comas won the next round at Jerez, with Apicella coming second. Comas won at Monza as well, this time pursued by Eddie Irvine.

At Enna, a dusty track surface was exacerbated by the rubber “marbles” that resulted from the wearing tires. Many of the favorites spun out of the race, and Gianni Morbidelli won despite a spin of his own. Eddie Irvine managed to come in fourth with a broken front wing, having been off the track at least three times. Irvine won from Apicella at Hockenheim after polesitter Hill had spun off early.

Allan McNish won on a drying Brands Hatch track as the series returned to England. Van de Poele took his second win of the year at the Birmingham Superprix, a race in which Fabrizio Barbazza walked away from a spectacular accident. On the Bugatti Circuit at Le Mans, championship leader Comas led away. He was challenged by Philippe Gache, who put in a surprising drive in a year-old Lola before retiring. Comas won the race and clinched the title.  Van de Poele won in the wet at Nogaro to take second in the championship. The final round, scheduled to be held at Dijon-Prenois was cancelled. An official statement cited the Gulf crisis and French talks on tobacco sponsorship as the reasons behind the cancellation.

Teams and drivers

Calendar

Final points standings

Driver
In each championship round, 9 points were awarded to the winning driver, 6 to the runner up, 4 for third place, 3 for fourth place, 2 for fifth place and 1 for sixth place. No additional points were awarded.

Complete Overview

R6=retired, but classified  R=retired NS=did not start NQ=did not qualify DIS(3)=disqualified after finishing in third position

References

External links
 Unofficial F3000 Information - International F3000 1990
 1990  F3000 season review
 1990 F3000 images
 1990 F3000 video - Birmingham

International Formula 3000
International Formula 3000 seasons